The 2016–17 season was Walsall's 129th season in their existence and their tenth consecutive season in League One. Along with competing in League One, the club participated in the FA Cup, League Cup and EFL Trophy.

The season covers the period from 1 July 2016 to 30 June 2017.

Transfers

In

Out

Loans in

Loans out

Competitions

Pre-season friendlies

League One

League table

Matches

FA Cup

EFL Cup

EFL Trophy

Squad statistics
Source:

Numbers in parentheses denote appearances as substitute.
Players with squad numbers struck through and marked  left the club during the playing season.
Players with names in italics and marked * were on loan from another club for the whole of their season with Walsall.
Players listed with no appearances have been in the matchday squad but only as unused substitutes.
Key to positions: GK – Goalkeeper; DF – Defender; MF – Midfielder; FW – Forward

References

Walsall
Walsall F.C. seasons